Draper Island is located just inside the Michigan border, in Watersmeet Township, Gogebic County, Michigan, United States. The island is one of two inhabited islands in Lac Vieux Desert, the other being Duck Island, Wisconsin. Sometimes shown on older maps as Koch Island or Oak Island and locally as Rose Island  the current name was designated official by the Board on Geographic Names Decisions of the U.S. Geological Survey in 1962.

Notes 

Islands of Gogebic County, Michigan
Lake islands of Michigan